The Journal of Clinical Pharmacology is a peer-reviewed medical journal that covers the field of pharmacology. The editor-in-chief is Joseph S. Bertino, Jr. (Bertino Consulting). It was established in 1961 and is currently published by John Wiley & Sons in association with the American College of Clinical Pharmacology.

Title history
The journal was founded in 1961 as The Journal of New Drugs. It was known from 1967 to 1970 as The Journal of Clinical Pharmacology and the Journal of New Drugs and from 1970 to 1973 as The Journal of Clinical Pharmacology and New Drugs. In 1973 it obtained its present title.

Abstracting and indexing 
The Journal of Clinical Pharmacology is abstracted and indexed in the following bibliographic databases:

References

External links 
 
 American College of Clinical Pharmacology

Wiley-Blackwell academic journals
English-language journals
Pharmacology journals
Monthly journals
Publications established in 1961